The 2020 Hamburg European Open was a men's tennis tournament played on outdoor red clay courts. It was the 114th edition of the German Open Tennis Championships and part of the ATP Tour 500 series of the 2020 ATP Tour. Originally scheduled for 13 to 19 July 2020, but due to the ongoing COVID-19 pandemic, it was rescheduled from 20 to 27 September 2020 and took place at the Am Rothenbaum in Hamburg, Germany.

Points and prize money

Points distribution

Prize money

Singles main draw entrants

Seeds

 1 Rankings as of September 14, 2020.

Other entrants
The following players received wildcards into the main draw:
  Yannick Hanfmann
  Karen Khachanov
  Philipp Kohlschreiber 

The following player received entry as a special exempt into the main draw:
  Dominik Koepfer

The following player used a protected ranking into the main draw:
  Kevin Anderson

The following players received entry from the qualifying draw:
  Pablo Cuevas
  Tommy Paul
  Tennys Sandgren
  Jiří Veselý

The following players received entry as a lucky loser:
  Alexander Bublik
  Gilles Simon

Withdrawals
  Matteo Berrettini → replaced by  Ugo Humbert
  Pablo Carreño Busta → replaced by  Casper Ruud
  Alex de Minaur → replaced by  Jan-Lennard Struff
  David Goffin → replaced by  Albert Ramos Viñolas
  Hubert Hurkacz → replaced by  Lorenzo Sonego
  John Isner → replaced by  Adrian Mannarino
  Diego Schwartzman → replaced by  Alexander Bublik
  Denis Shapovalov → replaced by  Gilles Simon

Retirements
   Benoît Paire (COVID-19)

Doubles main draw entrants

Seeds 

 1 Rankings as of September 14, 2020.

Other entrants 
The following pairs received wildcards into the doubles main draw:
  Yannick Hanfmann /  Mats Moraing 
  Frederik Nielsen /  Tim Pütz

The following pair received entry from the qualifying draw:
  Radu Albot /  Aisam-ul-Haq Qureshi

The following pair received entry as lucky losers:
  Marvin Möller /  Milan Welte

Withdrawals
  Marcel Granollers /  Horacio Zeballos → replaced by   Marvin Möller /  Milan Welte

Retirements
  Robert Farah /  Juan Sebastián Cabal (COVID-19 reasons)

Champions

Singles 

  Andrey Rublev def.  Stefanos Tsitsipas, 6–4, 3–6, 7–5

Doubles 

  John Peers /  Michael Venus def.  Ivan Dodig /  Mate Pavić, 6–3, 6–4

References

External links 
 

 
2020s in Hamburg
2020 in German tennis
2020
2020 ATP Tour
September 2020 sports events in Germany
Tennis events postponed due to the COVID-19 pandemic